The Grand Bay Savanna- Little River Road Tract Addition was acquired with financial support from the U.S. Fish and Wildlife Service in 2004, through the National Coastal Wetlands program. This tract serves as an addition to the Grand Bay Savanna Addition Tract State Nature Preserve acquired in 1996. The addition consists of 113 acres of piney flatwoods south of Grand Bay, Alabama.

External links
 Forever Wild Program: 662-Acre Nature Preserve, Conservation, and Recreation Tract - Grand Bay Savanna Addition Tract

Nature Conservancy preserves
Nature reserves in Alabama
Protected areas of Mobile County, Alabama